Lataniieae is a subtribe of plants in the family Arecaceae. Genera in the subtribe are:

Latania – Mascarenes
Lodoicea – Seychelles
Borassodendron – Malay Peninsula, Borneo
Borassus – Africa and Asia

See also 
 List of Arecaceae genera

References

External links 

 
Arecaceae subtribes